The 2005–06 daytime network television schedule for the five major English-language commercial broadcast networks in the United States in operation during that television season covers the weekday daytime hours from September 2005 to August 2006. The schedule is followed by a list per network of returning series, new series, and series canceled after the 2004–05 season.

Affiliates fill time periods not occupied by network programs with local or syndicated programming. PBS – which offers daytime programming through a children's program block, PBS Kids – is not included, as its member television stations have local flexibility over most of their schedules and broadcast times for network shows may vary. Also not included are UPN (as the network did not offer any daytime programs this season), and i: Independent Television, as its schedule was composed mainly of syndicated reruns.

Legend

 New series are highlighted in bold.

Schedule
 All times correspond to U.S. Eastern and Pacific Time scheduling (except for some live sports or events). Except where affiliates slot certain programs outside their network-dictated timeslots, subtract one hour for Central, Mountain, Alaska, and Hawaii-Aleutian times.
 Local schedules may differ, as affiliates have the option to pre-empt or delay network programs. Such scheduling may be limited to preemptions caused by local or national breaking news or weather coverage (which may force stations to tape delay certain programs in overnight timeslots or defer them to a co-operated or other contracted station in their regular timeslot) and any major sports events scheduled to air in a weekday timeslot (mainly during major holidays). Stations may air shows at other times at their preference.

Monday-Friday

 Notes:
 Kids' WB ran temporary stunt blocks of animated series in the 4:30 and 5:00 p.m. ET time slots during December 2005, including:
  Xiaolin Showdown (December 12,22,27)
  Johnny Test (December 13,21,26)
  Coconut Fred's Fruit Salad Island (December 14,19,29)
  The Batman (December 15,20)
  Viewtiful Joe (Aired for 90 minutes from 4:00 to 5:30 on December 16 then, for one hour from 4:30 to 5:30 on December 28)
  Loonatics Unleashed (December 23,30)
 On January 2, 2006, Daytime WB debuted as Kids WB! had been reduced only to Saturdays.

Saturday

Sunday

By network

ABC

Returning series:
ABC World News Tonight with Peter Jennings
All My Children
General Hospital
Good Morning America
Kim Possible
Lilo & Stitch: The Series
NBA Inside Stuff
One Life to Live
Phil of the Future
Power Rangers S.P.D.
The Proud Family
That's So Raven
This Week with George Stephanopoulos
The View

New series:
The Buzz on Maggie
The Emperor's New School
NBA Access with Ahmad Rashad
Power Rangers Mystic Force
The Suite Life of Zack and Cody

Not returning from 2004–05:
Even Stevens
Fillmore!
Lizzie McGuire
Power Rangers Dino Thunder
W.I.T.C.H.

CBS

Returning series:
As the World Turns
The Backyardigans
Blue's Clues
The Bold and the Beautiful
Dora the Explorer
The Early Show
CBS Evening News with Dan Rather
CBS News Sunday Morning
Face the Nation
Guiding Light
LazyTown
Little Bill
The Price is Right
The Saturday Early Show
The Young and the Restless

New series:
Go, Diego, Go!

Not returning from 2004–05:
Miss Spider's Sunny Patch Friends

NBC

Returning series:
Darcy's Wild Life
Days of Our Lives
Endurance
Kenny the Shark
Meet the Press
NBC Nightly News with Tom Brokaw
Passions
Time Warp Trio
Today
Trading Spaces: Boys vs. Girls
Tutenstein

New series:
Flight 29 Down

Not returning from 2004–05:
Croc Files
Jeff Corwin Unleashed
Scout's Safari
Strange Days at Blake Holsey High

Fox

Returning series:
The Cramp Twins
Fox News Sunday
Kirby: Right Back at Ya!
Mew Mew Power
NFL Under the Helmet
One Piece
Sonic X
Teenage Mutant Ninja Turtles
This Week in Baseball
Ultimate Muscle: The Kinnikuman Legacy
Winx Club

New series:
Magical DoReMi
Bratz
G.I. Joe: Sigma 6

Not returning from 2004–05:
Alien Racers
F-Zero: GP Legend
The Menu
Shaman King

The WB

Returning series:
The Batman
MegaMan: NT Warrior
Pokémon: Advanced Battle
Xiaolin Showdown
Yu-Gi-Oh!

New series:
8 Simple Rules 
Charmed 
Coconut Fred's Fruit Salad Island
ER 
Johnny Test
Loonatics Unleashed
Pepper Dennis 
Smallville 
Spider Riders
Supernatural 
Transformers: Cybertron
Twins 
Viewtiful Joe
What I Like About You 

Not returning from 2004–05:
Da Boom Crew
Foster's Home for Imaginary Friends
Jackie Chan Adventures
¡Mucha Lucha!
Teen Titans
What's New Scooby-Doo?

See also
2005–06 United States network television schedule (prime-time)
2005–06 United States network television schedule (late night)

United States weekday network television schedules
2005 in American television
2006 in American television